An American Werewolf in Paris (the "An" does not appear in the title scene) is a 1997 comedy horror film directed by Anthony Waller, screenplay by Tim Burns, Tom Stern, and Waller, and starring Tom Everett Scott and Julie Delpy. It follows the general concept of, and is a sequel to, John Landis's 1981 film An American Werewolf in London. The film is an international co-production between companies from the United States, France, the Netherlands, and Luxembourg.

Unlike its predecessor, An American Werewolf in London, which was distributed by Universal Pictures, this film was distributed by Buena Vista Pictures under its Hollywood Pictures division. Upon theatrical release, the film was met with unfavorable reviews.

Plot 
Andy McDermott is a tourist seeing the sights of Paris with his friends Brad and Chris. When Serafine Pigot (presumably the daughter of the werewolf from the first film)  leaps off the Eiffel Tower just before Andy is about to bungee jump, he executes a mid-air rescue. She vanishes into the night, leaving Andy intrigued. That night, Andy, Chris, and Brad attend a nightclub called Club de la Lune hosted by Serafine's friend Claude. Serafine is not present, so Chris volunteers to go back to her house. He frees her from a cell in the basement and is locked in it. He escapes when he finds a legless werewolf confined to a bed. The club's owner, Claude, is actually the leader of a werewolf society that uses the club as a way to lure in people (preferably tourists) to be killed. Serafine arrives, tells Andy to run away, and transforms into a werewolf. The club owners transform into werewolves as well, and butcher all the guests, including Brad and Chris.

The next day, Andy wakes up at Serafine's house. She tells him he is transforming into a werewolf. This revelation is interrupted by the ghost of Serafine's mother. Andy jumps out the window in panic and runs away. Chris tries to get his attention, but Claude kidnaps him. Brad's ghost appears to Andy and explains his werewolf condition. For Andy to become normal again, he must eat the heart of the werewolf that bit him, and for Brad's ghost to be at rest, the werewolf that killed him must be killed. After developing an appetite for raw meat, Andy hooks up with an American tourist named Amy Finch at a cemetery. He transforms and kills her and a cop who tailed him, suspecting Andy was involved in the Club de la Lune massacre. Andy is arrested, but escapes. He begins to see Amy's ghost, and she tries to find ways to get him killed.

Claude and his henchmen capture Andy and pressure him to join their society, but Andy must kill Chris to prove his loyalty. Serafine again saves him, and they return to her home to find her basement ransacked and her stepfather, the confined werewolf, dead. Serafine explains that her stepfather prepared a drug to control werewolf transformations, but the drug had the opposite effect: forced transformation. As a result of testing on Serafine, she killed her mother and savaged her stepfather. Claude had stolen these drugs during the ransacking.

Andy and Serafine learn of a Fourth of July party Claude has planned and infiltrate it. They try to help the people escape, but flee once they see that police have entered. Claude and his men inject themselves with the transforming-inducing drug and slaughter almost all the guests. Andy and Serafine flee after killing a werewolf and setting Brad's spirit free. Serafine takes the drug to fight another werewolf when they become separated. Andy encounters them but, not knowing who is who, he accidentally shoots her and leaves her to be found by the police. A werewolf then attacks him, chasing him down to an underground train track. The train stops due to it hitting the werewolf. It gets on the train where it attacks the driver and several passengers. The drug wears off, revealing Claude as the werewolf. Claude tries to inject himself with the last vial, but he is interrupted by Andy and the two fight. When Andy finds that Claude is the culprit behind his infection, the two struggle to obtain the last vial of the drug, and Andy is accidentally injected. After transforming, Andy kills and eats Claude's heart, thus ending his own werewolf curse and presumably Serafine's (this point is not clarified since earlier in the movie Serafine implied that Claude had stolen her blood to become a werewolf. In an alternate ending, after Andy eats Claude's heart, Serafine has a vision of her stepfather in the back of an ambulance, explaining how he found a cure before his death). An ambulance transports her to the hospital.

Serafine and Andy celebrate their wedding atop the Statue of Liberty with Andy's pal Chris, who survived. They bungee jump off when Chris accidentally drops the wedding ring from the statue.

Cast 
 Tom Everett Scott as Andy McDermott
 Julie Delpy as Sérafine Pigot McDermott
 Vince Vieluf as Brad
 Phil Buckman as Chris
 Julie Bowen as Amy Finch
 Pierre Cosso as Claude
 Tom Novembre as Inspector LeDuc
 Thierry Lhermitte as Thierry Pigot
 Anthony Waller as Metro Driver
 Isabelle Constantini as Serafine's Mother

Production

Development 
The film's title has its roots in the production of its predecessor; when production of the original London film ran into trouble with British Equity, director John Landis, having scouted locations in Paris, considered moving the production to France and changing the title of his film to An American Werewolf in Paris.

Landis was approached by PolyGram Pictures to develop a sequel to the first movie, as Landis explained in the book Beware the Moon: The Story of An American Werewolf in London:I was asked to do a sequel by PolyGram in 1991. The company, under Jon Peters and Peter Guber, made something like 10 or 12 movies, and the only one that made money was American Werewolf. They then left the company and were replaced by a guy called Michael Kuhn. He called me and said that they were interested in making a sequel. I entertained the idea for a little bit and then came up with something that I liked and wrote a first draft of the script.

Landis's draft focused on Debbie Klein (a character mentioned but never seen or heard in the original film) getting a job in London, and her subsequent investigation into the deaths of David and Jack. Several characters from the original film, including Alex Price, Dr. Hirsch, and Sgt. McManus returned, but the studio turned down the script. Polygram Pictures still wanted to do a sequel, but Landis, unwilling to write a second treatment, told them to just make the sequel without him.

By 1993, writer/director John Lafia had written and submitted his own draft to the studio. The storyline for Lafia's draft focused on a schoolteacher in Paris who holds forth on good and evil in a class he teaches. The teacher is bitten by a lycanthrope and goes through the expected changes, while on his trail is the doctor from the first film, who has been working on a werewolf serum. In an interview with Fangoria, Lafia stated that the studio was not interested in his script.

After Lafia left the project, Tom Stern and Tim Burns, who had previously worked on the short-lived MTV series The Idiot Box and the 1993 comedy film Freaked, were hired to write a new script, with Stern set as director. Stern and Burns's script followed a young American named Andy McDermott, who is vacationing in Spain when he is called to Paris after hearing that his uncle was savaged by a mysterious beast there. In keeping with the tradition of An American Werewolf in London, Stern and Burns loaded the script with as many songs referring to the moon as they could find. As part of the preproduction process, Stern had makeup effects (FX) artists Steve Johnson and Tony Gardner work on preliminary designs for the monster, and Phil Tippett, who had worked on Jurassic Park, was going to use computer graphics to bring the beast to life for full-body shots, while the closeups would be handled by the makeup FX crew using animatronic heads. Once they turned in their script to the studio, the studio informed Stern that while they liked the script, he was no longer going to be directing the film. Stern said in an interview: "They were planning to do it on, a medium-low budget, around $10-12 million, and they felt comfortable with me directing it at that level. Then when I handed it in, they liked it so much that they wanted to do it on a higher budget, and they needed a big-name director they could use the foreign presales, since Polygram, which owns Propaganda, is a foreign company."

Marco Brambilla, whose film Demolition Man was a major international hit, was brought on to take over directing. According to Stern, Brambilla's approach was going to involve the traditional half-man, half-wolf look, with FX to be created by Amalgamated Dynamics.

After a meeting with Brambilla, both Stern and Burns left and moved on to other projects, with Burns stating: "There wasn’t any shouting or anything... but it was such a strange feeling. We’d been working on this for a year and a half, and put all this thought into it. He'd been on it for a week and was saying 'I don't think the ending works' and 'this scene's got to go'." Stern added, "We took pride in writing a villain that was somewhat charming and had a compelling argument because the great villains are the ones that have a great pitch and make you think 'wow, I can see the logic to this.' He just wanted a cartoon villain that was twirling his moustache and being all 'ultimate evil'."

The project fell into limbo for about two years. During that time, 12 screenwriters, including Larry Brothers, Neal Purvis, and Robert Wade did rewrites on Stern and Burn's script, with Purvis and Wade contributing the danger tour and the bungee jump off the Eiffel Tower. During the hiatus, Brambilla left, and was replaced by Anthony Waller, who had gained a cult following for his low-budget thriller Mute Witness. Upon joining the project, Waller rewrote the script. After the arbitration process, the final screenplay credit went to Stern, Burns, and Waller.

Locations 
Filming took place in Amsterdam, Luxembourg, Metz, and New York City, and on location in Paris.

Alternate endings 

In an alternate ending, after Andy eats Claude's heart, Serafine has a vision of her stepfather in the back of an ambulance, explaining how he found a cure before his death. The closing scene shows Andy and Chris visiting Serafine at a hospital, where she has given birth to a child, whose eyes shift to look like the werewolves'; another version of the alternate ending features Inspector LeDuc (in Chris's place) at the hospital.

Release 
An American Werewolf in Paris opened theatrically in the United Kingdom on October 31, 1997, in the United States on December 25, and in France on May 6, 1998.

Box office 
In its opening weekend, the film ranked seventh in the United States and Canada box office and third among new releases, earning $7.6 million. By the end of its run, Paris grossed $26.6 million from a $25 million budget.

Critical reception 
On Rotten Tomatoes, the film has an approval rating of 7% based on reviews from 30 critics, with an average rating of 3.72/10. The website's critical consensus reads, "Markedly inferior to its cult classic predecessor in every way, An American Werewolf in Paris is felled by the silver bullets of clumsy storytelling and chintzy special effects." On Metacritic, it has a score of 31 out of 100 based on reviews from 13 critics, indicating "generally unfavorable reviews".

USA Today gave the film two out of four stars, citing unfunny gags, a "charmless" performance by lead actor Tom Everett Scott, and a failure to tap into the Parisian setting, though they praised Anthony Waller's direction. Russell Smith of The Austin Chronicle called An American Werewolf in Paris "a fast-paced, entertaining homage that recaptures a fair amount of the old lunatic energy and subversive humor [of the original]." While he criticized that the characters often seem clueless in the face of obvious danger, he found the film offered a great deal of fun and that the transformation effects, while not enhanced by the usage of CGI, are "repulsively convincing". He gave it two and a half out of five stars. Writing for ReelViews, James Berardinelli derided the film's sitcom-level comedy, unintentionally humorous scares, and gratuitous nudity, but said the emotionally compelling performance by Julie Delpy and the occasional strong directorial strokes prevent it from succeeding as campy, "so bad it's good" entertainment. He gave it one and a half out of four stars.

Unlike its predecessor, which had Oscar-winning special make-up effects by Rick Baker, Paris relied heavily on CGI for its transformation effects and chase sequences, a common point of derision from most critics.

The film was nominated for Worst Sequel at the 1997 Stinkers Bad Movie Awards, but lost to Speed 2: Cruise Control.

John Landis, the director of An American Werewolf in London, said, "I was really disappointed when I saw that film, I thought it was lousy".

Soundtrack 

A soundtrack for An American Werewolf in Paris was released on CD and cassette tape through Hollywood Records on September 23, 1997. It featured music from artists such as Bush, Better Than Ezra, and Cake. The film's soundtrack is largely responsible for the Bush song "Mouth" releasing as a single in October 1997, as it was featured prominently in the film and trailer. The single, marked as a release from the soundtrack, charted on several Billboard charts, including the Mainstream Rock Tracks and Modern Rock Tracks charts.

The soundtrack was on Billboard's Top Album Sales chart for 5 weeks but, at its peak, only placed at number 80.

Track list

References

External links 
 
 

1997 films
1997 horror films
1990s monster movies
1990s comedy horror films
Dutch horror films
Luxembourgian horror films
American films with live action and animation
American comedy horror films
American werewolf films
American sequel films
French comedy horror films
French sequel films
1990s English-language films
Films set in 1997
Films set in Paris
Films shot in Amsterdam
Films shot in France
Films shot in Luxembourg
Films shot in New York City
Films shot in Paris
Hollywood Pictures films
Films directed by Anthony Waller
English-language French films
English-language Dutch films
English-language Luxembourgian films
1990s American films
1990s French films